Fault Line is a role-playing game adventure published by TSR in 1985 for the Marvel Super Heroes role-playing game.

Contents
Fault Line is a scenario in which Spider-Man, Captain America, the Wasp, and the Black Knight have a limited amount of time in which to save New York City from destruction by an earthquake.

Publication history
MH8 Fault Line was written by Kim Eastland, and was published by TSR, Inc., in 1985 as a 16-page book, a large color map, and an outer folder.

Reception

Reviews

References

Marvel Comics role-playing game adventures
Role-playing game supplements introduced in 1985